Allison Scagliotti (born September 21, 1990) is an American actress, musician and director, best known for her roles in Drake & Josh, Warehouse 13, and Stitchers. She performs as a musician under her real name.

Early life
Scagliotti's great-grandparents immigrated to the United States from Italy through Ellis Island. She moved with her family to Mandeville, Louisiana at a young age. At age five, she joined her Louisiana school's, Tchefuncte Middle School, talent and drama program.

When Scagliotti was 11, she was working with an acting coach who encouraged her to try auditioning for pilot season in Los Angeles. She booked a pilot for a sitcom with Chevy Chase which was filmed in New York. Scagliotti moved to Los Angeles for her acting career.

Scagliotti studied film at New York University, though she never finished her degree. She later obtained a bachelor's degree in Interdisciplinary Music Studies through Berklee College of Music's online program. She is the first cousin of Kevin Pfeffer, the lead singer of Five Minutes to Freedom, and Alex Scagliotti, National Wakeboard Champion.

Career
Scagliotti has had numerous small television roles during her career including One Tree Hill, CSI, and the Nickelodeon series Zoey 101.

Scagliotti landed her first recurring role as Mindy Crenshaw on Drake & Josh, Josh's rival and later girlfriend. She appeared in seven episodes from 2004 to 2007. She reprised her role in the spin-off movie, Merry Christmas, Drake & Josh. Her first lead role was as Maddie in the 2005 short film Redemption Maddie.

She appeared as Jayna, the female Wonder Twin, in the episode "Idol" in the ninth season of Smallville in 2009. She helped co-host SyFy's Ghost Hunters Live on Halloween 2010.

Scagliotti is best known for her portrayal of the character Claudia Donovan in the Syfy series Warehouse 13. Her character was introduced early in the premiere season in 2009 and she appeared in most of the remaining episodes through 2014 (though credited as a guest star until season two).  Her character crossed over to Eureka when she guest-starred in the season four episode "Crossing Over".

She appeared in the 2011 indie film Losers Take All, set in the 1980s rock music scene.

In December 2012, Scagliotti appeared in the lead role of Michelle, a struggling actress, in Darren Caulley's play Unhealthy that premiered December 4 at HERE Arts Center in New York City. She appeared in the three seasons of Freeform's Stitchers as Camille, a main character, from 2015 to 2017. Scagliotti also appeared in the series The Vampire Diaries as Georgie in a recurring role during the show's eighth and final season in 2016.

Other work
In 2014, Scagliotti joined the advisory board of Sci-Fest LA, the first annual Los Angeles Science Fiction One-Act Play Festival, held in May 2014.

From 2015 to 2018, Scagliotti was in a band known as Nice Enough People along with Drake and Josh co-star Jerry Trainor. In 2016, she appeared as a guitar player in the music video "Some Are Girls" for Maxie Dean.

In 2019, Scagliotti released her first solo EP under the pseudonym "La Femme Pendu". Scagliotti's first album, Absolute Horror, was released on May 1, 2020, and the second, VAMPYR, on October 22, 2021.

Appearances
Scagliotti appeared in a 2010 episode of The Nerdist Podcast hosted by Chris Hardwick. She also appeared as a guest star on Geek & Sundry's TableTop in 2013, hosted by Wil Wheaton, and as a guest on the show Destination Truth in 2017.

Filmography

Film

Television

Theater performances

References

External links 

 
 

1990 births
21st-century American actresses
Actresses from California
Actresses from Louisiana
American child actresses
American film actresses
American people of Italian descent
American television actresses
Berklee College of Music alumni
Living people
People from Monterey, California
People from Mandeville, Louisiana
New York University alumni